Joseph Faro (fl. 1694–1696, last name occasionally Farrell, Firra, or Faroe) was a pirate from Newport active during the Golden Age of Piracy, primarily in the Indian Ocean. He is best known for sailing alongside Thomas Tew to join Henry Every’s pirate fleet which captured and looted the fabulously rich Mughal ship Gunsway.

History 
In 1694 a number of Newport pirate vessels prepared to set sail with Tew, among them Joseph Bankes’ barque Portsmouth Adventure. Bankes (or Banks) transferred his commission to Joseph Faro, who captained the 90-ton 6-gun Portsmouth Adventure with a crew of 60. Among his crew was future pirate captain Dirk Chivers.

After nearly a year on voyage, in 1695 Tew, Faro, and three other captains (William Mayes, Richard Want, and Thomas Wake) joined up with Every and his ship Fancy and waited for the Mughal's treasure-laden convoy. Most of the convoy escaped, but the Gunsway and her escort Fateh Mohammed were straggling behind and after a protracted fight was overtaken and brutally looted by Every and his crew. Tew had been killed during the battle while Want and Wake's slower ships were left behind. Only Faro and Mayes arrived in time to help Every, but Every denied Faro and his crew a full share of the vast riches, claiming they had never joined in the fighting.

Afterward, Faro took the Portsmouth Adventure into the Persian Gulf, and then back to Madagascar, where Faro's ship was wrecked on Mayotte. Every rescued Faro and some of his crew en route to the Bahamas; some of Faro's crew joined Every, and a few even made it back to Newport, while Chivers and others remained behind to be later rescued by Robert Glover in the Resolution. Faro later captained the sloop Sea Flower which transported Every back to Ireland when the latter chose to retire.

See also
Pirate Round, the route from the American east coast, around Africa, and into the Indian Ocean via Madagascar.

References

American pirates
17th-century pirates
People of colonial Rhode Island
Piracy in the Indian Ocean
1696 deaths
Year of birth missing
People from Newport, Rhode Island